Francis Xavier Lê Văn Hồng is a Vietnamese prelate. He was Archbishop of Huế until 2016 and the Vice President of the Catholic Bishops' Conference of Vietnam.

Biography
Francis Xavier Hồng was born on June 30, 1940 in Quang Tri, Vietnam. After finishing his studies at Pius X Pontifical College in Da Lat, he was ordained a priest for the Archdiocese of Hue on December 21, 1969. He was a professor at Hoan Thien minor seminary and served as a parish priest until he was sent to France for his further studies in 1999. He returned to Vietnam in 2002 and was in charge of pastoral activities for Phú Hậu Parish.

On February 19, 2005, he was named Auxiliary Bishop of Huế and was consecrated by Stephen Nguyễn Như Thể, Archbishop of Huế on April 7 the same year.

He was appointed Archbishop of Huế on August 18, 2012 by Pope Benedict XVI, succeeding Archbishop Stephen Thể after the latter's resignation due to age limit.

On October 29, 2016, Pope Francis named Joseph Nguyễn Chí Linh as his successor in the Archdiocese of Hue.

References

External links 
Catholic Hierarchy: Archbishop Francis Xavier Lê Văn Hồng
 http://tonggiaophanhue.net/home/dulieu/tulieu/tieusu_duc_tgm_phanxico_xavie.htm

1940 births
Living people
21st-century Roman Catholic bishops in Vietnam
People from Quảng Trị province